Rollersville is an unincorporated community on the border between Madison and Scott townships in Sandusky County, Ohio, United States. Rollersville had a post office from 1839 to 1908.

History
A post office called Rollersville was established in 1839, and remained in operation until 1908. The community was named for Henry Roller, a War of 1812 veteran and pioneer settler.

References

Unincorporated communities in Sandusky County, Ohio
Unincorporated communities in Ohio